Dexter B. Florence Memorial Field  (formerly identified as M89 by FAA) is a city-owned public-use airport located one nautical mile (2 km) south of the central business district of Arkadelphia, a city in Clark County, Arkansas, United States.

This airport is included in the FAA's National Plan of Integrated Airport Systems for 2011–2015, which categorized it as a general aviation facility.

Facilities and aircraft 
Dexter B. Florence Memorial Field covers an area of 164 acres (66 ha) at an elevation of 182 feet (55 m) above mean sea level. It has one runway designated 4/22 with an asphalt surface measuring 5,002 by 75 feet (1,525 x 23 m).

For the 12-month period ending July 31, 2010, the airport had 31,400 aircraft operations, an average of 86 per day: 98% general aviation, 1% air taxi, and 1% military. At that time there were 30 aircraft based at this airport: 93% single-engine and 7% multi-engine.

References

External links 
 Aerial image as of 25 January 2001 from USGS The National Map
 

Airports in Arkansas
Transportation in Clark County, Arkansas
Arkadelphia, Arkansas